The War of the Second Coalition (1798/9 – 1801/2, depending on periodisation) was the second war on revolutionary France by most of the European monarchies, led by Britain, Austria, and Russia, and including the Ottoman Empire, Portugal, Naples, and various German monarchies. Prussia did not join this coalition, and Spain supported France.

The overall goal of Britain and Russia was to contain the expansion of the French Republic and restore the monarchy in France, whereas Austria, still weakened and in deep financial debt from the War of the First Coalition, primarily sought to recover its position and come out of the war stronger than it entered. Due in important part to this difference in strategy among the three major allied powers, the Second Coalition failed to overthrow the revolutionary regime, and French territorial gains since 1793 were confirmed. In the Franco–Austrian Treaty of Lunéville in February 1801, France held all its previous gains and obtained new lands in Tuscany, Italy, while Austria was granted Venetia and the Dalmatian coast. Most other allies also signed separate peace treaties with the French Republic in 1801. Britain and France signed the Treaty of Amiens in March 1802, followed by the Ottomans in June 1802, bringing an interval of peace in Europe that lasted several months, until Britain declared war on France again in May 1803. The renewed hostilities culminated in the War of the Third Coalition.

Background

On 20 April 1792, the French Legislative Assembly declared war on Austria. In the War of the First Coalition (1792–97), France fought against most of the states with which it shared a border, as well as Great Britain, Portugal and Prussia. The Coalition forces achieved several victories at the outset of the war, but were ultimately repulsed from French territory and then lost significant territories to the French, who began to set up client republics in their occupied territories. Napoleon Bonaparte's efforts in the northern Italian campaigns of the French Revolutionary Wars pushed Austrian forces back and resulted in the negotiation of the Treaty of Leoben (18 April 1797) and the Treaty of Campo Formio (October 1797), leaving Britain to fight on alone against France, Spain and the Netherlands.

Peace interrupted

From October 1797 until March 1799, France and Austria, the signatories of the Treaty of Campo Formio, avoided armed conflict but remained suspicious of each other, and several diplomatic incidents undermined the agreement. The French demanded additional territory not mentioned in the Treaty. The Habsburgs were reluctant to hand over designated territories, much less additional ones. The Congress at Rastatt proved inept at orchestrating the transfer of territories to compensate the German princes for their losses. Republicans in the Swiss cantons, supported by the French army, overthrew the central government in Bern and established the Helvetic Republic.

Other factors contributed to the rising tensions. In the summer of 1798, Napoleon led an expedition to Egypt and Syria. On his way to Egypt, he had stopped at the heavily fortified port city of Valletta, the capital city of Malta. Grand Master Ferdinand von Hompesch zu Bolheim, who ruled the island, allowed only two ships at a time in the harbour, in accordance with the island's neutrality. Napoleon immediately ordered the bombardment of Valletta, and on 11 June 1798, General Louis Baraguey d'Hilliers directed a landing of several thousand French troops at strategic locations around the island. The French Knights of the order deserted, and the remaining Knights failed to mount a successful resistance. Napoleon forcibly removed the other Knights from their possessions, angering Paul, Tsar of Russia, who was the honorary head of the Order. Moreover, the French Directory was convinced that the Austrians were conniving to start another war. Indeed, the weaker the French Republic seemed, the more seriously the Austrians, Neapolitans, Russians and British actually discussed this possibility. Napoleon's army got trapped in Egypt, and after he returned to France (October 1799), it eventually surrendered (September 1801).

Preliminaries to war

Military planners in Paris understood that the Upper Rhine Valley, the southwestern German territories, and Switzerland were strategically important for the Republic's defence. The Swiss passes commanded access to northern Italy; consequently, the army that held those passes could move troops to and from northern and southern theatres quickly.

Toward this end, in early November 1798, Jourdan arrived in Hüningen to take command of the French forces there, called the Army of Observation because its function was to observe the security of the French border on the Rhine. Once there, he assessed the forces' quality and disposition and identified needed supplies and manpower. He found the army woefully inadequate for its assignment. The Army of the Danube and its two flanking armies, the Army of Helvetia and the Army of Mayence, or Mainz, were equally short of manpower, supplies, ammunition, and training; most resources were already directed to the Army in Northern Italy, the Army of Britain, and the Egyptian expedition. Jourdan assiduously documented these shortages, pointing out in lengthy correspondence to the Directory the consequences of an undermanned and undersupplied army; his petitions seemed to have little effect on the Directory, which sent neither significant additional manpower nor supplies.

Jourdan's orders were to take the army into Germany and secure strategic positions, particularly on the southwest roads through Stockach and Schaffhausen, at the westernmost border of Lake Constance. Similarly, as commander of the Army of Helvetia (Switzerland), Andre Massena would acquire strategic positions in Switzerland, in particular the St. Gotthard Pass, the passes above Feldkirch, particularly Maienfeld (St. Luciensteig), and hold the central plateau in and around Zürich and Winterthur. These positions would prevent the Allies of the Second Coalition from moving troops back and forth between the northern Italian and German theatres, but would allow French access to these strategic passes. Ultimately, this positioning would allow the French to control all western roads leading to and from Vienna. Finally, the army of Mayence would sweep through the north, blocking further access to and from Vienna from any of the northern Provinces, or from Britain.

Formation of the Second Coalition 

The Second Coalition took several months to form, starting with Naples allying itself with Austria (19 May 1798) and Russia (29 November), after which British Prime Minister Pitt and Austrian State Chancellor Thugut (the latter only on the condition that Russia also joined the coalition) failed to persuade Prussia (which had left the First Coalition as early as April 1795) to join in. Neither were Britain and Austria able to formalise an alliance, due to lack of an agreement on the loan convention that would cover Austria's outstanding debt to Britain from the previous war, let alone British subsidy to Austria for the upcoming war; they resorted to ad hoc cooperation without formal agreement. Next, Russia allied itself with the Ottoman Empire (23 December) and Great Britain (26 December) while attacking the French Ionian Islands. By 1 December, the Kingdom of Naples had signed alliances with both Russia and Great Britain.

The preliminary military action under the alliance occurred on 29 November when General Karl Mack, an Austrian serving for Naples, occupied Rome, wishing to restore papal authority with its Neapolitan army. King Ferdinand was pushed by his angry German wife Queen Maria Carolina, Marie Antoinette’s sister, and by Horatio Nelson through his secret lover, the British Ambassador's wife Emma, Lady Hamilton. All these companions became reckless gamblers when the poor Neapolitan army was not only soon defeated outside Rome and pushed back, but Naples itself was occupied by France on January 23. The king, the British officials and the women had only the time to escape to Sicily.

War

1799

In Europe, the allies mounted several invasions, including campaigns in Italy and Switzerland and an Anglo-Russian invasion of the Netherlands. Russian general Alexander Suvorov inflicted a series of defeats on the French in Italy, driving them back to the Alps. The allies were less successful in the Anglo-Russian invasion of Holland, where the British and Russians retreated after a defeat at Castricum, and in Switzerland, where after initial victories an Austro-Russian army was completely routed at the Second Battle of Zurich. These reverses, as well as British insistence on searching shipping in the Baltic Sea, led to Russia's withdrawal from the Coalition.

Napoleon invaded Syria from Egypt, but retreated after a failed siege of Acre, repelling a British-Turkish invasion. Alerted to the political and military crisis in France, he returned, leaving his army behind, and used his popularity and army support to mount a coup that made him First Consul, the head of the French government.

1800

Napoleon sent Moreau to campaign in Germany, and went himself to raise a new army at Dijon and march through Switzerland to attack the Austrian armies in Italy from behind.

Moreau meanwhile invaded Bavaria and won a great battle against Austria at Hohenlinden. He continued toward Vienna and the Austrians sued for peace. The result was the Armistice of Steyr on 25 December.

In May 1800, Napoleon led his troops across the Alps through the Great St. Bernard Pass into Italy in a military campaign against the Austrians. He narrowly defeated the Austrians at the Battle of Marengo. While the Austrians had a much larger force, Napoleon was able to organise a hurried retreat from the village before returning with reinforcements. The French successfully charged the Austrian flank with cavalry and Napoleon negotiated for Austria to leave Piedmont, Liguria and Lombardy.

1801

Prior to the Acts of Union of July/August 1800, Ireland was a separate kingdom, with its own parliament, held in a personal union with Great Britain under the Crown. In response to the 1798 United Irishmen revolt, it became part of the United Kingdom of Great Britain and Ireland, effective 1 January 1801.

The Austrians signed the Armistice of Treviso on 16 January, ending the war in northern Italy. On 9 February, they signed the Treaty of Lunéville for the entire Holy Roman Empire, basically accepting the terms of the previous Treaty of Campo Formio. In Egypt, the Ottomans and British invaded and compelled the French to surrender after the fall of Cairo and Alexandria.

Britain continued the war at sea. A coalition of noncombatants including Prussia, Russia, Denmark, and Sweden joined to protect neutral shipping from Britain's blockade, resulting in Nelson's surprise attack on the Danish fleet in harbour at the Battle of Copenhagen.

France and Spain invaded Portugal in the War of Oranges, forcing Portugal to sign the Treaty of Badajoz (1801).

Russia formally made peace with France through the Treaty of Paris on 8 October, signing a secret alliance two days later.

In December 1801, France dispatched the Saint-Domingue expedition to recapture the island, which had been independent since the 1791 Haitian Revolution. This included over 30,000 troops with many experienced and elite veterans, but ended in catastrophic failure; by the end of 1802, an estimated 15,000 – 22,000 had died of disease and yellow fever, among them Napoleon's brother-in-law General Charles Leclerc.

Aftermath 
On 25 March 1802, Britain and France signed the Treaty of Amiens, ending British involvement in the war. After a preliminary treaty signed at Paris on 9 October 1801, the Treaty of Paris of 25 June 1802 ended the war between France and the Ottoman Empire, the last remaining member of the Second Coalition. Thus began the longest period of peace during the period 1792–1815. The treaty is generally considered to be the most appropriate point to mark the transition between the French Revolutionary Wars and the Napoleonic Wars, although Napoleon was not crowned emperor until 1804.

Strategic analysis 
American historian Paul W. Schroeder (1987) claimed that, at the time of his writing, most historians – exemplified by Piers Mackesy (1984) – had all too simplistically blamed the Second Coalition's failure on the requirement of 'Britain and Russia to trust Austria, when it was obvious that Austria could not be trusted'. These historians had assumed that Austria failed to act in accordance with the Coalition's common goal of invading France, ending the Revolution and restoring the Bourbon monarchy, because Vienna was too selfish and too greedy for territorial expansion. Schroeder argued it was not that simple: while Austria's primary war aim was not to overthrow the French Republic, it was reasonable for Vienna to set its own conditions for entering a war with France. The enormous financial debt it still had from the War of the First Coalition jeopardised not just the Habsburg Monarchy's ability to field an army capable of defeating the French, but had also caused hyperinflation and internal instability that risked a revolution inside Austria itself. The Habsburg monarchy's very survival was at stake, and so Emperor Francis II and Thugut resolved not to enter a war in order to defeat France at all costs, but to make Austria come out stronger than it went in. Moreover, Schroeder reasoned that all the other great powers that were negotiating to form the Second Coalition – Russia, Prussia (which ultimately remained neutral), Britain, and the Ottoman Empire – were duplicitous: each was afraid of and scheming against the others to make sure it gained the most from the war and the others would gain little or actually grow weaker with the new postwar balance of power.

See also 
 List of battles of the War of the Second Coalition
 War of the First Coalition
 War of the Third Coalition

Notes

References

Citations

Sources 

 Acerbi, Enrico. "The 1799 Campaign in Italy: Klenau and Ott Vanguards and the Coalition’s Left Wing April–June 1799". Napoleon Series, Robert Burnham, editor in chief. March 2008. Retrieved 30 October 2009.
 Ashton, John. English caricature and satire on Napoleon I. London: Chatto & Windus, 1888.
 Blanning, Timothy. The French Revolutionary Wars. New York: Oxford University Press, 1996, .
 Boycott-Brown, Martin. The Road to Rivoli. London: Cassell & Co., 2001. .
 Bruce, Robert B. et al. Fighting techniques of the Napoleonic Age, 1792–1815. New York: Thomas Dunne Books, St. Martin's Press, 2008, 978-0312375874
 Chandler, David. The Campaigns of Napoleon. New York: Macmillan, 1966.  ; comprehensive coverage of N's battles
 Clausewitz, Carl von (2020). Napoleon Absent, Coalition Ascendant: The 1799 Campaign in Italy and Switzerland, Volume 1. Trans and ed. Nicholas Murray and Christopher Pringle. Lawrence, Kansas: University Press of Kansas. 
 Clausewitz, Carl von (2021). The Coalition Crumbles, Napoleon Returns: The 1799 Campaign in Italy and Switzerland, Volume 2. Trans and ed. Nicholas Murray and Christopher Pringle. Lawrence, Kansas: University Press of Kansas. * Dwyer, Philip. Napoleon: The Path to Power (2008)  excerpt vol 1
 
 Gill, John. Thunder on the Danube Napoleon's Defeat of the Habsburgs, Volume 1. London: Frontline Books, 2008, .
 Griffith, Paddy. The Art of War of Revolutionary France, 1789–1802 (1998)
 Hochedlinger, Michael.  Austria's Wars of Emergence 1683–1797. London: Pearson, 2003, .
 Kagan, Frederick W. The End of the Old Order. Cambridge, MA: Da Capo Press 2006, .
 
  Mackesy, Piers. British Victory in Egypt: The End of Napoleon's Conquest (2010)
  Mackesy, Piers.  War Without Victory: The Downfall of Pitt, 1799–1802 (1984)
 ; 303 pages; short biography by an Oxford scholar
 ; well-written popular history
 Pivka, Otto von. Armies of the Napoleonic Era. New York: Taplinger Publishing, 1979. 
 Phipps, Ramsay Weston. The Armies of the First French Republic, volume 5: The armies of the Rhine in Switzerland, Holland, Italy, Egypt and the coup d'état of Brumaire, 1797–1799, Oxford: Oxford University Press, 1939.
 Roberts, Andrew. Napoleon: A Life (2014)
 Rodger, Alexander Bankier. The War of the Second Coalition: 1798 to 1801, a strategic commentary (Clarendon Press, 1964)
 Rothenberg, Gunther E. Napoleon's Great Adversaries: Archduke Charles and the Austrian Army 1792–1814. Spellmount: Stroud, (Gloucester), 2007. .
 
 Schroeder, Paul W. The Transformation of European Politics 1763–1848 (1994) 920 pp; advanced history and analysis of major diplomacy online
 Smith, Digby. The Napoleonic Wars Data Book. London: Greenhill, 1998. 
 _.  Klenau. "Mesko". "Quosdanovich". Leopold Kudrna and Digby Smith (compilers). A biographical dictionary of all Austrian Generals in the French Revolutionary and Napoleonic Wars, 1792–1815.  The Napoleon Series, Robert Burnham, editor in chief. April 2008 version. Retrieved 19 October 2009.
 _. Charge! Great cavalry charges of the Napoleonic Wars. London: Greenhill, 2007. 
 , 412 pages; by an Oxford scholar

External links 
 

 
Conflicts in 1798
Conflicts in 1799
Conflicts in 1800
Conflicts in 1801
Conflicts in 1802
Coalition, Second
Coalition, 2nd
18th century in France
19th century in France
19th-century military history of the United Kingdom
French Directory
French Consulate